Tokh-Orda is a rural locality (a selo) in Tlyaratinsky Selsoviet, Tlyaratinsky District, Republic of Dagestan, Russia. The population was 192 as of 2010.

Geography 
Tokh-Orda is located 2 km northeast of Tlyarata (the district's administrative centre) by road. Tlyarata and Tilutl are the nearest rural localities.

References 

Rural localities in Tlyaratinsky District